Louis J. Gaudinot (born August 28, 1984) is an American professional mixed martial artist who formerly competed in the UFC's Flyweight division. A professional competitor since 2009, Gaudinot has also formerly competed on Spike TV's The Ultimate Fighter: Team Bisping vs. Team Miller as a Bantamweight.

Background
Gaudinot began training in martial arts with Tiger Schulmann well over twenty years ago because of where he grew up and how small he was as a child.  Being tiny in a bad neighborhood, Louis's parents knew he would have to defend himself at one or many points in his life, so they brought him to the Tiger Schulmann's in Yonkers NY when he was six years old. Originally, he trained in Kyokushin Karate and over time began also training in grappling. Gaudinot later earned a fourth degree black belt in karate.

Mixed martial arts career

Early career
After many years of training, in 2008, Gaudinot made his amateur debut. He held a 3–1 record as an amateur before turning professional in 2009.

Ring of Combat
Gaudinot signed with New Jersey's Ring of Combat to compete as a professional in April 2009. His debut came at Ring of Combat 24 against fellow 0-0 fighter, Chris Aquino. Gaudinot controlled the bout and won the fight via unanimous decision after two, four-minute rounds. After the fight, he stirred some controversy when he flipped off Aquino's corner.

Gaudinot fought on the next card at Ring of Combat 25 and took his first professional loss, losing a unanimous decision to Nick Cottone.

At Ring of Combat 26, Gaudinot bounced back from his loss to Cottone with a second round TKO victory over Jeff Cressman. Two months later Gaudinot was again in action, and again was fighting on back-to-back Ring of Combat cards. On the Ring of Combat 27 card he competed in his first three round fight, winning via unanimous decision against Nate Williams.

Gaudinot fought against Tuan Pham at Ring of Combat 28, winning the fight via KO in the first round. The impressive victory earned Gaudinot a chance at the vacant Ring of Combat Flyweight Championship. His title shot came at Ring of Combat 31 against Jesse Riggleman. Gaudinot dominated the bout and won via submission (guillotine choke) nearing the end of the first round.

The Ultimate Fighter
In 2011, Gaudinot had signed with the UFC to compete on The Ultimate Fighter: Team Bisping vs. Team Miller. In the first episode, Gaudinot faced Paul McVeigh; winning via TKO in the third round. The win gained Gaudinot entry into the Ultimate Fighter house. He was selected as a part of Team Bisping.

Gaudinot next fought against Team Mayhem's Dustin Pague. Gaudinot lost the fight in the second round via rear-naked choke submission. The fight also won Gaudinot and Pague an additional $25,000 for the fan voted "Fight of the Season".

Ultimate Fighting Championship
Gaudinot made his official UFC debut on December 3, 2011 at The Ultimate Fighter 14 Finale against Johnny Bedford. Gaudinot lost to Bedford via TKO in the third round.

Gaudinot returned to the flyweight division and faced former Jungle Fight Bantamweight Champion, John Lineker, on May 5, 2012 at UFC on Fox 3. The bout was contested at a catchweight of 127 lb, as Lineker missed weight. Gaudinot defeated Lineker via guillotine choke submission in the second round after an action-packed, back-and-forth first two rounds. Both participants earned Fight of the Night honors for their performances.

Gaudinot was expected to face Darren Uyenoyama on October 5, 2012 at UFC on FX 5.  However, Gaudinot was forced out of the bout with an injury and replaced by promotional newcomer Phil Harris.

Gaudinot faced Tim Elliott on August 31, 2013 at UFC 164. He lost the fight via dominant unanimous decision.

Gaudinot faced Phil Harris at UFC Fight Night 37. He won the fight via submission in the first round. However, on June 20, the win was overturned to a No Contest after it was revealed Gaudinot had failed his drug test.

Gaudinot was expected to face Patrick Holohan on October 4, 2014 at UFC Fight Night: MacDonald vs. Saffiedine, but pulled out of the bout due to injury.

Gaudinot faced Kyoji Horiguchi on January 3, 2015 at UFC 182. He lost the fight by unanimous decision and was subsequently released from the organization.

Post-UFC career
In his first fight since being released from the UFC, Gaudinot faced off against Bellator veteran Claudio Ledesma in the main event of CFFC 51 on September 12, 2015. Gaudinot made a successful rebound from a three-fight slump, winning the fight with a dominant unanimous decision verdict.

The win over Ledesma granted Gaudinot a title shot against the CFFC Flyweight Champion Sidemar Honório, which took place at CFFC 57 on March 19, 2016. He won the fight via first-round knockout, claiming the championship which he later vacated with no title defenses.

Gaudinot then challenged Phil Caracappa for the Ring of Combat Bantamweight Championship at ROC 65 on September 21, 2018. He lost the fight via unanimous decision.

Championships and accomplishments

Mixed martial arts
Cage Fury Fighting Championships
CFFC Flyweight Champion (One time; former)
Ring of Combat
Ring of Combat Flyweight Champion (One time)
Ultimate Fighting Championship
Fight of the Season (The Ultimate Fighter 14)
Fight Of The Night (One time)

Mixed martial arts record

|-
|Loss
|align=center|8–5 (1)
|Phil Caracappa
|Decision (unanimous)
|Ring of Combat 65
|
|align=center|3
|align=center|5:00
|Atlantic City, New Jersey, United States
|
|-
|Win
|align=center|8–4 (1)
|Sidemar Honório 
|TKO (punches)
|CFFC 57: Gaudinot vs. Honório 
|
|align=center|1
|align=center|0:59
|Philadelphia, Pennsylvania, United States
|
|-
|Win
|align=center|7–4 (1)
|Claudio Ledesma
|Decision (unanimous)
|CFFC 51: Ledesma vs. Gaudinot
|
|align=center|3
|align=center|5:00
|Bethlehem, Pennsylvania, United States
|
|-
|Loss
|align=center|6–4 (1)
|Kyoji Horiguchi
|Decision (unanimous)
|UFC 182
|
|align=center|3
|align=center|5:00
|Las Vegas, Nevada, United States
|
|-
|NC
|align=center|6–3 (1)
|Phil Harris
|NC (overturned)
|UFC Fight Night: Gustafsson vs. Manuwa
|
|align=center|1
|align=center|1:13
|London, England
|
|-
|Loss
|align=center|6–3
|  Tim Elliott
|Decision (unanimous)
|UFC 164
|
|align=center|3
|align=center|5:00
|Milwaukee, Wisconsin, United States
|
|-
|Win
|align=center|6–2
|  John Lineker
|Technical Submission (guillotine choke)
|UFC on Fox: Diaz vs. Miller
|
|align=center|2
|align=center|4:54
|East Rutherford, New Jersey, United States
|
|-
|Loss
|align=center|5–2
|  Johnny Bedford
|TKO (knees to the body)
|The Ultimate Fighter 14 Finale
|
|align=center|3
|align=center|1:58
|Las Vegas, Nevada, United States
|
|-
|Win
|align=center|5–1
|  Jessie Riggleman
|Submission (guillotine choke) 
|Ring of Combat 31 
|
|align=center|1
|align=center|4:43
|Atlantic City, New Jersey, United States
|
|-
|Win
|align=center|4–1
|  Tuan Pham
|KO (punch)
|Ring of Combat 28 
|
|align=center|1
|align=center|1:09
|Atlantic City, New Jersey, United States
|
|-
|Win
|align=center|3–1
|  Nate Williams
|Decision (unanimous)
|Ring of Combat 27
|
|align=center|3
|align=center|4:00
|Atlantic City, New Jersey, United States
|
|-
|Win
|align=center|2–1
|  Jeff Cressman
|TKO (punches) 
|Ring of Combat 26
|
|align=center|2
|align=center|0:24
|Atlantic City, New Jersey, United States
|
|-
|Loss
|align=center|1–1
|  Nick Cottone
|Decision (unanimous) 
|Ring of Combat 25 
|
|align=center|2
|align=center|4:00
|Atlantic City, New Jersey, United States
|
|-
|Win
|align=center|1–0
|Chris Aquino
|Decision (unanimous)
|Ring of Combat 24 
|
|align=center|2
|align=center|4:00
|Atlantic City, New Jersey, United States
|

Mixed martial arts exhibition record

|-
|Loss
|align=center| 1–1
|Dustin Pague
|Submission (rear-naked choke)
|The Ultimate Fighter: Team Bisping vs. Team Miller
|
|align=center|2
|align=center|2:32
|Las Vegas, Nevada, United States
|Quarterfinal Bout. Fight Of The Season.
|-
|Win
|align=center|1–0
|Paul McVeigh
|TKO (elbow and punches)
|The Ultimate Fighter: Team Bisping vs. Team Miller
|
|align=center|3
|align=center|4:59
|Las Vegas, Nevada, United States
|Preliminary Bout.

See also
 List of current UFC fighters
 List of male mixed martial artists

References

External links
 
 

American male mixed martial artists
American sportspeople in doping cases
Doping cases in mixed martial arts
Flyweight mixed martial artists
Living people
Mixed martial artists utilizing Kyokushin kaikan
Mixed martial artists from New York (state)
1984 births
American male karateka
Ultimate Fighting Championship male fighters